Moyale is a mainly Borona market town on the border between Ethiopia and Kenya, and is the administrative centre for two Ethiopian woredas, Moyale of Oromia Region and Moyale of Somali Region.

Moyale is the main border post on the Nairobi-Addis Ababa road, lying north of the Dide Galgalu Desert. It is known for its traditional architecture.

History 

An early settler at Moyale was a Greek by the name of Philip Zaphiro, (later to become the British Vice Consul and Oriental Secretary to Ethiopia) who had a station which he had named "Fort Harrington". When C.W. Gwynn visited in 1908, Zaphiro's station consisted of a garden that covered several acres and his house, located on a spur projecting from the Boran highlands, and providing access through the line of cliffs that run along the border. "This route may well become some day a considerable trade artery," Gwynn predicted. "Fort Harrington is therefore well placed as a healthy administrative post and as a possible commercial centre."

During World War II, both parts of the town were captured by Italians from Ethiopia in 1940, and retaken by the British on 15 July 1941.

Tensions rose in the Kenyan side of Moyale in early 1999, after an imam was shot dead during an Ethiopian raid across the Ethiopian-Kenyan border in pursuit of rebels of the Oromo Liberation Front (OLF). The Kenyan residents of the town, held demonstrations condemning the action, which they attributed to Ethiopian security men who believed he was a sympathizer of the OLF. In March 2018, nine civilians were killed by the Ethiopian National Defense Force near Moyale after being misidentified as Oromo Liberation Front militants.

In November 2009, Ethiopian Prime Minister Meles Zenawi announced plans to extend the Ethiopian railroad to Moyale. This would facilitate Kenyan plans, which at the time were at an advanced stage, to develop the port of Lamu and connect it to the Kenyan side of Moyale with a tarmac road.

Moyale town is located at the frontier border between the traditional territories of Oromo peoples and Somalis living in the southwestern part of Ethiopia. Thus this business town is disputed between the two dominant ethnic groups who are Oromos and Somalis. Moyale saw four days of ethnic clashes in July 2012 over a long-standing land dispute between Borana and Garre communities, exacerbated by drought conditions. The fighting left at least eighteen dead, and more than twenty thousand people fled across the border into Kenya.

Demographics 

For the Ethiopian share of Moyale, based on figures from the Central Statistical Agency in 2005, it has an estimated total population of 25,038 of whom 13,665 are men and 11,373 are women. The 1994 Ethiopian census reported that the Ethiopian side of Moyale had a total population of 13,962, of whom 7,411 were men and 6,551 were women. (This total also includes an estimate for parts of the town of Moyale, which were not counted; for these parts of the town, it was estimated there were 3,419 inhabitants, of whom 1,752 were men and 1,667 were women.) The eight largest ethnic groups reported in Moyale were the Borana Oromo (50.25%), Garre somali (30.30%), the Burji (9.75%), the Amhara (7.42%), the Degoodi Somali (4.95%), the Welayta (4.82%), and the Silt'e (4.28%). Oromo was spoken as a first language by 55.30%, second were 25.70% spoke by Somali, 15.96% spoke Burji, 3.96% spoke Welayta, and 3.62% spoke Silt'e.

The Kenyan part of Moyale has an urban population of 9,276 (1999 census).

One stop border crossing 

In June 2021, the one stop border post (OSBP) crossing at Moyale began commercial operations. Officials from both countries sit together in one office and clear passengers and cargo, through immigration, customs, revenue collection and health clearance, saving time. This is the first OSBP for Ethiopia while Kenya maintains four others at Busia and Malaba with Uganda and at Namanga and Taveta with Tanzania.

Climate 

Moyale has a hot semi-arid climate (Köppen BSh) moderated somewhat by altitude. Typically for East Africa, there are two rainy seasons: the “long rains” from March to May and the weaker, less reliable “short rains” in October and November.

References

External links 

Divided cities
Populated places in Marsabit County
Ethiopia–Kenya border crossings
Cities and towns in Oromia Region